Kundali or Amritakundalin (अमृतकुण्डलिन्), also known in Chinese as Juntuli Mingwang and in Japanese as Gundari Myōō (軍荼利明王), is a wrathful deity and dharmapala (protector of the Dharma) in East Asian Esoteric Buddhism.

In Buddhist thought, Amritakundalin is seen as the dispenser of Amrita, the celestial nectar of immortality. When classified among the Five Wisdom Kings (vidyārāja), fierce incarnations or emissaries of the Five Wisdom Buddhas, he is considered to be the manifestation of Ratnasambhava, one of the five buddhas who is associated with the southern direction. When classified among the Eight Wisdom Kings, he is considered to be the manifestation of the bodhisattva Akashagarbha and is associated with the north-west direction. When classified among the Ten Wisdom Kings, he is considered to be the manifestation of Amitabha, another of the Five Wisdom Buddhas.

Worship

Bīja and mantra

Kundali's mantra is as follows:

See also
Wisdom King
Acala
Trailokyavijaya
Yamantaka
Vajrayakṣa
Ratnasambhava
Kangiten
Kundalini

References

Citations

Works cited

External links

Wisdom Kings
Wrathful deities
Herukas
 Kundali Milan | Kundali Matching